The New York City Council LGBT Caucus is a caucus of LGBT members of the New York City Council. The  Caucus's stated purpose is "to advance the rights of Lesbian, Gay, Bisexual and Transgender (LGBT) individuals through education, legislation, public policy changes and advocacy" and "to increase the visibility of LGBT New Yorkers through events, forums and media outreach." The Caucus has grown from membership of as low as two members in 2005 to seven as of 2017. Former speakers Corey Johnson and Christine Quinn were members of the caucus. David Carr became the first gay Republican elected to the council in 2021.

Current members

Former members

Activities 
In the 2010 legislative session, the LGBT Caucus was responsible for introducing a resolution seeking U.S. Congress to repeal its "Don't ask, don't tell" policy on gays in the military.

In 2016, Daniel Dromm, a former public school teacher and member of the Caucus, led the effort in funding the first LGBT liaison within the NYC Department of Education Office of Safety and Youth Development, with the goal of fighting LGBT intolerance and seeking ways to be inclusive to LGBT communities.

The Caucus rebuked Mayor Eric Adams appointment of several anti-LGBTQ individuals to the Mayor's Office.

References

External links
 Official website

LGBT caucuses